Vitrea transsylvanica is a species of small, air-breathing land snail, a terrestrial pulmonate gastropod mollusk in the family Pristilomatidae.

Distribution 
This species occurs in:
 Czech Republic
 Ukraine

References

Pristilomatidae
Gastropods described in 1877